Game Doctors is an App studio well known for creating "Zombie Smash" which has been downloaded more than 3 million times was acquired by App publisher Zynga  during December 2012

Published games 
Zombie Smash for IOS
Zombie Smash HD for IOS

External links
Game Doctors website
Zombie Smash Official Page
Zynga Acquisition
Zynga Acquisition

Video game companies of Germany
Video game development companies